Punjabi folk music has a wide range of traditional musical instruments used in folk music and dances like Bhangra, Giddha etc. Some of the instruments are rare in use and to find even. Here are some best known traditional instruments of the Punjab region used in various cultural activities.

Instruments

Here is a list of Punjabi folk musical instruments in alphabetical order:

 Algoze
 Bugchu
 Chimta
 Dilruba
 Dhadd
 Dhol
 Gagar
 Gharha
 Ektara
 Kato
 Khartal
 Sapp
 Sarangi
 Tumbi

See also
 Punjabi music
 Punjabi folk music
 Sikh music
 Indian music

References

 
Punjabi music
Punjabi language
Folk dances of Punjab
Pakistani musical instruments
Punjabi folklore